Lancelot Robert Regnier (17 July 1919 – 13 July 1982) was an Australian rules footballer who played with Carlton and St Kilda in the Victorian Football League (VFL).

Regnier served in the Australian Army during World War II.

Notes

External links 

Lance Regnier's profile at Blueseum

1919 births
1982 deaths
Carlton Football Club players
St Kilda Football Club players
Australian rules footballers from Melbourne
Sandringham Football Club players
People from Hawthorn, Victoria
Australian Army personnel of World War II
Military personnel from Melbourne